The 2007 Vuelta a Venezuela was held from August 27 to September 9, 2007. The 44th annual edition of the stage race started with an Individual Time Trial (18.8 km) in Carúpano, and ended in Caracas.

Stages

2007-08-27: Carupano — Rio Caribe (18.8 km)

2007-08-27: Carupano Circuito (76.8 km)

2007-08-28: Casanay — Santa Barbara de Tapirin (187.5 km)

2007-08-29: Maturín Circuito (44.8 km)

2007-08-30: Santa Barbara de Tapirin — Cantaura (142.8 km)

2007-08-31: Pariaguan — Valle de la Pascua (220.6 km)

2007-09-01: San José Tiznado — Acarigua (216.2 km)

2007-09-02: Acarigua Circuito (76.8 km)

2007-09-03: Ospina — Barinas Circuito (180.1 km)

2007-09-04: Santa Bárbara de Barinas — San Cristóbal (162.3 km)

2007-09-05: La Fría — Mérida (160.3 km)

2007-09-06: Santa Elena de Arenales — Valera (170.6 km)

2007-09-07: La Libertad — San Felipe (220.9 km)

2007-09-08: San Pablo de Yaracuy — Maracay (189.2 km)

2007-09-09: Caracas Circuito (80 km)

Final classification

References 
 wvcycling
 cyclingwebsite
 cyclingnews

Vuelta a Venezuela
Venezuela
Vuelta Venezuela